This is a list of the National Register of Historic Places listings in Motley County, Texas.

This is intended to be a complete list of properties listed on the National Register of Historic Places in Motley County, Texas. There is one property listed on the National Register in the county. This property is also a Recorded Texas Historic Landmark.

Current listings

The locations of National Register properties may be seen in a mapping service provided.

|}

See also

National Register of Historic Places listings in Texas
Recorded Texas Historic Landmarks in Motley County

References

External links

Motley County, Texas
Motley County
Buildings and structures in Motley County, Texas